The fire-tufted barbet (Psilopogon pyrolophus) is a species of bird in the Asian barbet family Megalaimidae. It is native to Peninsular Malaysia and Sumatra, where it inhabits tropical moist lowland and montane forests. It has been listed as Least Concern on the IUCN Red List since 2004.
Its scientific name was proposed by Salomon Müller in 1836, who described a barbet from Sumatra.

Description

The moderately large bird (28 cm), the adult birds are overall green in appearance and have a brownish-maroon nape, grey lores, white band on the forehead, throat green, followed by a bright yellow band before a black band, appearing like a necklace separates the belly. The bill is fawn colored with a black vertical band. Tufts of feathers at the base of beak. Upper tufts fiery orange in males.

Distribution and habitat

Behaviour and ecology
The fire-tufted barbet is a resident bird and feeds on figs, other fruits, arthropods and insects. Its call is very similar to that of cicadas.

Threats
The primary threat to this species appears to be illegal capture and trade as a pet.

References

External links 

fire-tufted barbet
Birds of the Malay Peninsula
Birds of Malaysia
Birds of Sumatra
Taxa named by Salomon Müller
fire-tufted barbet
Articles containing video clips
Taxonomy articles created by Polbot